Peder Severin Krøyer (23 July 1851 – 21 November 1909), also known as P. S. Krøyer, was a Danish painter.

Life

Growing up and early training
Krøyer was born in Stavanger, Norway, on 23 July 1851 to Ellen Cecilie Gjesdal. He was raised by Gjesdal's sister, Bertha Cecilie (born 1817) and brother-in-law, the Danish zoologist Henrik Nikolai Krøyer, after his mother was judged unfit to care for him.  Krøyer moved to Copenhagen to live with his foster parents soon afterward.  Having begun his art education at the age of nine under private tutelage, he was enrolled in Copenhagen's Technical Institute the following year.

In 1870 at the age of 19 Krøyer completed his studies at the Royal Danish Academy of Art, where he had studied with Frederik Vermehren. In 1873 he was awarded the gold medal, as well as a scholarship.

Early career

His official debut as a painter was in 1871 at Charlottenborg with a portrait of a friend, the painter Frans Schwartz. He exhibited regularly at Charlottenborg throughout his life.

In 1874 Heinrich Hirschsprung bought his first painting from Krøyer, establishing a long-standing patronage. Hirschsprung's collection of art forms the basis of the Hirschsprung Museum in Copenhagen.

Travels
Between 1877 and 1881, Krøyer travelled extensively in Europe, meeting artists, studying art, and developing his skills and outlook.  He stayed in Paris and studied under Léon Bonnat, and undoubtedly came under the influence of contemporary impressionists – Claude Monet, Alfred Sisley, Edgar Degas, Pierre-Auguste Renoir and Édouard Manet.

He continued to travel throughout his life, constantly drawing inspiration from foreign artists and cultures.  Hirschsprung provided financial support during the early travels, and Krøyer continued exhibiting in Denmark throughout this period.

Krøyer comes to Skagen
 
In 1882 he returned to Denmark.  He spent June–October at Skagen, then a remote fishing village on the northern tip of Denmark, painting themes from local life, as well as depictions of the artistic community there.  He would continue to be associated with the developing art and literary scene at Skagen.  Other artists at Skagen included writers Holger Drachmann, Georg Brandes and Henrik Pontoppidan, and artists Michael Ancher and Anna Ancher.

Krøyer divided his time between rented houses in Skagen during the summer, a winter apartment in Copenhagen where he worked on his large commissioned portraits, and travel outside of the country.

Krøyer and Marie

On a trip to Paris in 1888 he encountered Marie Martha Mathilde Triepcke, whom he had known in Copenhagen. They fell in love and, after a whirlwind romance, married on 23 July 1889 at her parents' home in Germany. Marie Krøyer, who was also a painter, became associated with the Skagen community, and after their marriage was often featured in Krøyer's paintings. The couple had one child, a daughter named Vibeke, born in January 1895. They were divorced in 1905 following a prolonged separation.

Krøyer's eyesight failed him gradually over the last ten years of his life until he was totally blind. Ever the optimist, he painted almost to the end, in spite of health obstacles.  In fact, he painted some of his last masterpieces while half-blind, joking that the eyesight in his one working eye had become better with the loss of the other eye.

Krøyer died in 1909 in Skagen at 58 years of age after years of declining health. He had also been in and out of hospitals, suffering from bouts of mental illness.

Works

Krøyer's best known and best-loved work is entitled Summer Evening on Skagen's Southern Beach with Anna Ancher and Marie Krøyer, 1893. He painted many beach scenes featuring both recreation life on the beach (bathers, strollers), and local fishermen.

Another popular work is Midsummer Eve Bonfire on Skagen Beach (Sankthansbål på Skagen strand), 1906. This large-scale work features a great crowd of the artistic and influential Skagen community gathered around a large bonfire on the beach on Saint John's Eve (Midsummer Eve).

Both of these works are in the permanent collection of the Skagens Museum which is dedicated to that community of artists, including those who gathered around Krøyer, a great organizer and bon vivant.

Gallery

See also
 List of Danish painters
 List of paintings by Peder Severin Krøyer
 Skagen Painters

References 
 KID Kunst Index Danmark ("Art Index Denmark")
 Danish Biographical Encyclopedia ("Dansk Biografisk Lexikon")

Literature

External links
 Skagens Museum
 P. S. Krøyer in Hirschsprungske Samling
 Another selection of his paintings
Jennifer A. Thompson, "Interior of a Tavern by Peter Severin Krøyer (cat. 1015)," in The John G. Johnson Collection: A History and Selected Works, a Philadelphia Museum of Art free digital publication.

19th-century Danish painters
Danish male painters
20th-century Danish painters
Skagen Painters
1851 births
1909 deaths
Royal Danish Academy of Fine Arts alumni
People from Stavanger
Norwegian emigrants to Denmark
Recipients of the Thorvaldsen Medal
19th-century Danish male artists
20th-century Danish male artists